The Wachovia LPGA Classic was an annual women's professional golf tournament on the LPGA Tour that took place at the Berkleigh Country Club in Kutztown, Pennsylvania from 1996 through 2004. Betsy King, LPGA Tour player and native of nearby Reading, served as the tournament host.
Tournament names through the years:
1996–1997: CoreStates Betsy King Classic
1998–2002: First Union Betsy King Classic
2003–2004: Wachovia LPGA Classic Hosted by Betsy King

Winners

154-hole tournament

Tournament record

References

External links
Coverage on LPGA Tour's official site

Former LPGA Tour events
Golf in Pennsylvania
History of women in Pennsylvania